László Bakó (21 November 1872 in Sárközújlak, Kingdom of Hungary – 5 August 1928 in Budapest) was a Hungarian actor, most notable for appearing in the silent film Bánk Bán.

Life 
Bakó was born in Sárközújlak, Szatmár County, Hungary (now Livada in Satu Mare County, Romania). After graduating in 1899, he joined the National Theatre, of which he became a life member in 1920.

In 1898, Bakó won the Farkas-Ratkó Prize. At the National Theatre, the main roles he played were Coriolanus, Marc Antony and Brutus, King Lear, Othello, Shylock of Shakespeare's tragedies, Patúr-Petur bán in the Michael Curtiz film Bánk Bán, and Adam in Madách's The Tragedy of Man. He was also a trained singer who performed as a baritone.

He died in Budapest on 5 August 1928, at the age of 55.

References 
 Magyar életrajzi lexikon

1872 births
1928 deaths
Hungarian male actors
People from Satu Mare County